Zinc phosphate is an inorganic compound with the formula Zn3(PO4)2.  This white powder is widely used as a corrosion resistant coating on metal surfaces either as part of an electroplating process or applied as a primer pigment (see also red lead). It has largely displaced toxic materials based on lead or chromium, and by 2006 it had become the most commonly used corrosion inhibitor. Zinc phosphate coats better on a crystalline structure than bare metal, so a seeding agent is often used as a pre-treatment. One common agent is sodium pyrophosphate.

Minerals
Natural forms of zinc phosphate include minerals hopeite and parahopeite. A somewhat similar mineral is natural hydrous zinc phosphate called tarbuttite, Zn2(PO4)(OH). Both are known from oxidation zones of Zn ore beds and were formed through oxidation of sphalerite by the presence of phosphate-rich solutions. The anhydrous form has not yet been found naturally.

Dentistry
Zinc phosphate dental cement is one of the oldest and widely used dental  cements.  It is commonly used for luting permanent metal and zirconium dioxide restorations and as a base for dental restorations. Zinc phosphate cement is used for cementation of inlays, crowns, bridges, and orthodontic appliances and occasionally as a temporary restoration. 

It is prepared by mixing zinc oxide and magnesium oxide powders with a liquid consisting principally of phosphoric acid, water, and buffers. It is the standard cement to measure against. It has the longest track record of use in dentistry. It is still commonly used; however, resin-modified glass ionomer cements are more convenient and stronger when used in a dental setting.

References

External links 

Phosphates
phosphate
Inorganic pigments
Corrosion inhibitors
Dental materials